
This is a list of bridges documented by the Historic American Engineering Record in the U.S. state of Maryland.

Bridges

See also
List of tunnels documented by the Historic American Engineering Record in Maryland

References

List
List
Maryland
Bridges
Bridges